Haydarpaşa is a neighborhood within the Kadıköy and Üsküdar districts on the Asian part of Istanbul, Turkey. Haydarpaşa is named after Ottoman Vizier Haydar Pasha. The place, on the coast of Sea of Marmara, borders to Harem in the northwest and Kadıköy in the southeast. It is a historical area with almost solely public buildings. Haydarpaşa is administered by the Mukhtars of Rasımpaşa and Osmanağa parishes.

Internationally known structures around the area are the Haydarpaşa Terminal, Port of Haydarpaşa and the Selimiye Barracks in adjacent Harem.

Notable buildings
Following public structures, built in the 19th century or early 20th century during the Ottoman era, are found in Haydarpaşa:

Health and education

 Haydarpaşa Numune Hastanesi (Haydarpaşa Paragon Hospital)
 GATA Haydarpaşa Eğitim Hastanesi (Haydarpaşa Hospital of Gülhane Military Medical Academy)
 Dr Siyami Ersek Hospital — A renowned hospital for cardiology
 Marmara University, Faculty of Medicine, Haydarpaşa Campus. The building was used by Haydarpaşa Lisesi (Haydarpaşa High School) from 1933 through 1983
 Haydarpaşa Technical High schools

Transportation

 Haydarpaşa Terminal — One of the two main railway terminals of Istanbul serving the railway net in Anatolia
 Port of Haydarpaşa — Biggest container terminal in Istanbul
 Haydarpaşa Ferry boat terminal — Passenger ferries connecting trains to Sirkeci and Karaköy on the European side, and Kadıköy

Religion
 Haydarpaşa Cemetery — Historical British  military and civilian cemetery

Vicinity

 Selimiye Barracks — Historical barracks, where Florence Nightingale served between 1854–1856
 Karacaahmet Cemetery — Biggest cemetery in Turkey

References

Neighbourhoods of Kadıköy